SpeedMouse is a performance stage show by the Australian comic duo The Umbilical Brothers that initially ran from 2004 to 2006. The duo revived the stage show in 2016 in celebration of their 25 years performing as The Umbilical Brothers. The show was an influence for their later television programme The Upside Down Show (2006). Their performance at the Sydney Opera House was filmed for the live DVD, which was released in late 2004.

Plot
Taking advantage of the “latest advances” in performance technology, the boys have upgraded their acting to digital. Using this technology, they are able to jump immediately to any routine or fast forward through the boring bits. Unfortunately, the remote control has gone missing. Tensions arise when their newly hired roadie clashes with David — he points out that there is no need for any roadie, as there are no props or scenery to move. The situation worsens when their show controller Tina starts playing mind games with Shane.

Cast
David Collins as himself
Shane Dundas as himself
Roadie, performed by Tina
Tina, performed by Roadie
Mr Fluffy as himself (cameo)
The Koala as himself (cameo)

Certifications

References

External links
 Umbilical Brothers Official Website
 IMDB Entry

Australian comedy